Let Me In may refer to:

Fiction
 Let Me In (film), a 2010 American-British adaptation of the 2004 novel Let the Right One In by John Ajvide Lindqvist
 Let Me In: Crossroads, a limited comic book series, a prequel based on the film, by Marc Andreyko
 Let Me In, a 2016 film produced by and starring Alicia Keys

Music

Albums
 Let Me In (Chely Wright album) or the title song, 1997
 Let Me In (Johnny Winter album) or the title song, 1991
 Let Me In: Original Motion Picture Soundtrack, from the 2010 film
 Let Me In (Hollyn Cole extended play) or the title song, 2016

Songs
 "Let Me In" (Eddie Money song), 1989
 "Let Me In" (Hot Hot Heat song), 2007
 "Let Me In" (The Osmonds song), 1973
 "Let Me In" (The Sensations song), 1961
 "Let Me In" (Tom Dice song), 2013
 "Let Me In" (Young Buck song), 2004
 "Let Me In", by Beatsteaks from Living Targets, 2002
 "Let Me In", by Derringer from Derringer, 1976
 "Let Me In", by Eyes Set to Kill from Broken Frames, 2010
 "Let Me In", by H.E.R. from H.E.R., 2017
 "Let Me In", by Kleerup, 2014
 "Let Me In", by Loona from HaSeul, 2016
 "Let Me In", by Mike Francis, 1984
 "Let Me In", by R.E.M. from Monster, 1994
 "Let Me In (20 Cube)", by Enhypen from Border: Day One, 2020